The Aggie Bonfire leadership is composed of Texas A&M University students who are in charge of the construction of Aggie Bonfire, known as Bonfire. This large bonfire burned on the Texas A&M University campus annually from 1909 until 1999. Since 2003 the Bonfire has been burned unofficially off campus, and is known as Student Bonfire. The Aggie Bonfire leadership is responsible for safely managing the large number of student participants. Leaders are generally identified by the color of their "pots" (combat helmets).

History
Since 1909, students at Texas A&M University had built an annual bonfire on campus. Freshmen were expected to build the early Bonfires to help prove their worth. For almost two decades, the students constructed Bonfire from debris and wood acquired through various, sometimes illicit, means, including appropriating lumber intended for a dormitory in 1912. In 1935, a farmer reported that students carried off his entire barn as fuel for Bonfire. To prevent future incidents, the university made Aggie Bonfire a school-sanctioned event. The following year, for the first time, the school provided axes, saws, and trucks for the students and pointed them toward a grove of dead trees on the edge of town.

The early Bonfires were constructed under the leadership of the Corps of Cadets. All students were members of the Corps, which had its own leadership structure. When membership in the Corps became voluntary in 1965, this leadership structure was no longer viable; Corps leaders had no authority over the civilian students. A separate Bonfire leadership structure was instituted. The new leaders were designated with colored Vietnam-era combat helmets, or pots, with the overall leaders known as Redpots.

Leaders were chosen by their predecessors. Initiation rites for the upper echelon of leaders were often brutal, at times including beatings with ax handles or bar fights. Sportswriter Scott Eden commented that "these tests of toughness were meant to steel new Redpots for the job ahead." Knowledge was passed down from one leader to another verbally, with little to no official written documentation.

Each generation of Redpots strived to outdo the generation before. Despite the new height restrictions, in the 1970s, the Guinness Book of Records listed Aggie Bonfire as the largest Bonfire in the world.

While the Bonfires of the 1960s were constructed in five to ten days, working primarily in daylight, by the late 1970s, changes in the school led to a more elaborate and lengthy construction schedule. Construction began in late October with "Cut", obtaining wood by cutting down trees with axes, which took several weekends. After Cut, students brought the logs to campus during "Load", a process by which the logs were loaded by hand onto flatbed trucks and brought to campus. In early November, crews began "Stack", a three-week period in which the logs were wired together and Bonfire took shape.

Although between two and five thousand students participated in the construction of Bonfire each year, most worked only part-time, and many worked only one or two shifts. Student workers were organized by dormitories or Corps units, with a separate off-campus student crew. Many former students participated with crews they belonged to as students. Each crew had assigned shifts, although individuals were not limited to working only the assigned shifts.

Following the collapse of the 1999 Bonfire, which killed 12 current and former students, Texas A&M officials cancelled the annual event. In 2003, several current and former students founded Student Bonfire, a nonprofit organization which hosts an annual Bonfire, unaffiliated with the university, off-campus. The Bonfire leadership structure has remained in place, although in 2014 only 10 of the 26 dorms were represented by Bonfire crews.

Leadership roles

Redpots
Redpots are the leaders of Bonfire. Prior to 1999, there were 9 senior Redpots and 9 junior Redpots each year. These nine seniors and nine juniors were in charge of Bonfire as a whole, from the design of the structure to ensuring that all participants were following safety precautions while overseeing both Cut and Stack. There was no official written documentation for Bonfire, and all applicable information was passed orally from one year's Redpots to the next. Senior Redpots were responsible for training the Junior Redpots in the proper process and procedures for building the next year's Bonfire. In 2016, there are only 4 Senior and 3 Junior Redpots. These Redpots must follow the safety and construction procedures outlined in the Student Bonfire bylaws. As of 2022, there are 5 Senior and 2 Junior Redpots.

At the end of their junior year, Junior Redpots are promoted to Senior Redpots, and choose their successors. Redpots decorate their helmets with a list of their predecessors. The most famous Redpot is likely former Texas governor Rick Perry, from the class of 1972.

The head Redpot, essentially the CEO of Bonfire, is known as Head Stack. The other senior Redpot titles, colloquially known as "lines", represented in the past several years include Truck Pot, who is responsible for the hauling of the logs, and all vehicles and trailers, Head Civilian, who is the chief lumberjack overseeing the students who are not members of the Corps of Cadets, Brigade Woods, who is the counterpart chief lumberjack overseeing the students who are members of the Corps of Cadets, and Shockpot, who is responsible for the electrical setup of Bonfire. Redpots are denoted by the red color of their helmets as well as the ceremonial ax handles that they carry.

Brownpot
Brownpots are in charge of machinery at Cut and Stack. They are most often seen operating chainsaws at Cut and Stack sites. There were 6 Brownpots prior to 1999. Brownpots are the only people at Cut with permission to use machinery. After trees are felled by hand, Brownpots strip the branches and cut the logs into the appropriate lengths using chainsaws. Brownpots are the only individuals allowed to use chainsaws at any stage of Bonfire.

Buttpot
Buttpots are members of the Corps of Cadets and are usually juniors (the name "Buttpot" referring to "sergebutt", the moniker for all juniors in the corps). Each Corps outfit would have one junior designated as Buttpot for the outfit and would be in charge of all crew chiefs and fish for their unit, as well as serving as the spokesperson for the outfit. The non-reg equivalent of a Buttpot would be a yellow pot for the respective non-corps dorms on Texas A&M's campus. Buttpots could be identified by a Maroon pot with their outfit name on the front and "Buttpot" clearly written on the back, just as Yellowpots are identified by the yellow paint on theirs.

Yellowpot
Yellowpots are the liaison to higher on-site leadership for crews. Each dorm with enough volunteers will have a Yellowpot designated who serves as spokesman for that dorm, as well as manager to the crew chiefs of his dorm. One leadership position, Load Pot, technically falls within the hierarchy as a Yellowpot, but does not represent any specific dorm. The Load Pot is typically a junior who is charged with the responsibility of supervising Load directly with a Brownpot and a Redpot. The Load Pot is the head authority of Load site.

Crew chief
Crew chiefs are in charge of each dorm's crew while at Cut and Stack, serving as both instructors and supervisors. With larger dorms, there will be multiple crew chiefs to ensure that there is adequate supervision of the larger crews. Beyond their duties at Cut and Stack, crew chiefs are also responsible for organizing social events within their respective crew. In the Student Bonfire era, social events include a variety of casual athletic games, movie nights, hangouts/parties, board games, etc. Importantly every crew takes part in Dorm Dinner; where the crew will go to the dining hall together during the week, Dorm Dinner was still a major fixture prior to 1999. Events can take place on and off-campus, the purpose of social events is to foster a community within the crew along with the recruitment of new members.        
Most crews have their own designated "lines" for their crew chiefs. Similarly to the Redpots, chiefs will have various traits and roles associated with their line. Crew chiefs wear pots which are "passed down" from year to year along their line, typically the pot will contain a list of their predecessors. A few crews in Student Bonfire continue to pass down their original pots from before 1999.

Greenpot
Greenpots are in charge of administrative and financial aspects. These students are responsible for things such as checking people in at the beginning of the day, collecting organization dues, selling merchandise, and managing paperwork. While no position is technically restricted to certain genders, Greenpots are the only leadership position that has been historically held by females. This position was created in 2003.

Outhouse Crew/Orangepots
The Outhouse Crew is in charge of building the orange outhouse that sits on top of the bonfire stack. The Outhouse Crew is made up of 8 sophomore cadets from The Fightin' Texas Aggie Band. A crewmember is chosen from each of the six band outfits and a head crewmember and grode crewmember are also chosen. The outhouse is built in a secret location before being unveiled in front of the Dixie Chicken on Northgate. From there the outhouse is taken to the bonfire stack where a Redpot rides it to the top as it is lifted by crane.

Pinkpots
There were two Pinkpots, one senior and one junior who were in charge of Women's Bonfire Committee. Women's Bonfire Committee was made up of the chairs of every co-ed crew. Women's Bonfire Committee ran the Cookie Shack at stack site, packed and delivered lunches to crews during cut season, and sold and delivered supplies from pickup trucks. This position did not continue with Student Bonfire, however Women's Bonfire Committee restarted in 2016.

Transition of roles
The leadership roles themselves change each year as they are given, or "passed down", to younger students. The process for determining who gets the responsibility of these roles changes from pot to pot, but ultimately, the candidates are voted on according to who best represents the desired qualities. In the cases of crew chiefs and Yellowpots, the vote is decided within the dorm by the leaders for that year, and candidates are usually chosen from the freshman of that dorm. For the higher positions, such as the Redpots, the candidates are chosen from the pool of Crew Chiefs, Yellows, and any member of the applicable year. The Greenpots are the only non-dorm-specific pots that do not use crew chiefs or Yellowpots as candidates.

References

College Station, Texas
Fires in Texas
Texas A&M University traditions
University folklore